Frans I van Kinschot (1 May 1577 – 5 May 1651), Lord of Rivieren, Jette, Ganshoren, was a jurist and chancellor of Brabant.

Biography 
Van Kinschot was the son of councillor Hendrik van Kinschot and Margaretha Douglas dite Scott. He was a descendant of the van Kinschot family. He attended secondary school at the College of Ath, in Henegouwen, a renowned college in the Habsburg Netherlands. He then studied law at the University of Douai, where he graduated at the age of 18. He joined the law practice of his father, who was a lawyer at the Council of Brabant. Van Kinschot married Margareta Boote, daughter of Adriaen Boote, and in 1630, succeeded his father-in-law as treasurer general and chief of finance to Albert VII, Archduke of Austria.

Under Philip IV of Spain, he was appointed a member of the Council of State and a knight of the Order of Santiago. In 1649 he succeeded Ferdinand van Boisschot as Chancellor of Brabant. He died in 1651.

References

Footnotes

Bibliography

External links 
 

1577 births
1651 deaths
Chancellors of Brabant
People of the Eighty Years' War
Nobility of the Spanish Netherlands
Knights of Santiago
Jurists of the Spanish Netherlands
University of Douai alumni